Zargan-e Karaneh (also Romanized as Zargān-e Karāneh; also known as Zargān, Zargān Buzurg, Zargān-e Bozorg, and Zargān Garāneh) is a village in Veys Rural District, Veys District, Bavi County, Khuzestan Province, Iran. At the 2006 census, its population was 8,938, in 1,721 families.

References 

Populated places in Bavi County